not to be confused with Highland Presbyterian Church (Kentucky)

The Highland Presbyterian Church in Highland, Kansas, also known as the Highland United Methodist-Presbyterian Church is a historic church listed on the National Register of Historic Places in 2007.  It is located at 101 South Avenue in Highland.  It was built in 1914.

It is a -plan one-story brick church.  It was deemed "significant as a vernacular example of the Collegiate Gothic style and local construction."  After the church'2 1888 original building was destroyed by a fire, the new church was designed by church member R.B. Chandler, who was not an architect but sought to save money for the church.  He also oversaw construction.

References

External links
Church information

Presbyterian churches in Kansas
Methodist churches in Kansas
Churches on the National Register of Historic Places in Kansas
Gothic Revival church buildings in Kansas
Collegiate Gothic architecture
Churches completed in 1914
Buildings and structures in Doniphan County, Kansas
National Register of Historic Places in Doniphan County, Kansas